Michael Yani was the defending champion but decided not to participate. Alex Kuznetsov won the title defeating Bradley Klahn in the final.

Seeds

Draw

Finals

Top half

Bottom half

References
 Main Draw
 Qualifying Draw

Levene Gouldin and Thompson Tennis Challenger - Singles
2013 Singles
2013 Levene Gouldin & Thompson Tennis Challenger